9Now is a video on demand, catch-up TV service run by the Nine Network in Australia. The service launched on 27 January 2016, replacing Nine's previous service 9Jumpin. 9Now offers online live streaming of Channel 9, 9Gem, 9Go!, 9Life and 9Rush, as well as live news via nine.com.au.

In 2016, 9Now was at the centre of a legal challenge by then Nine regional television partner WIN Television, which helped contribute to an affiliation swaps for Nine and competitor Network 10.

As of January 2019, Nine claims to have more than 7m signups to its platform.

History

2010–2013: FIXPlay 
On 12 April 2010, as a part of its online entertainment brand TheFIX, the Ninemsn Company released FIXPlay, an online video on demand catch-up TV service for the Nine Network, incorporating locally produced programs from Nine and GO! along with back-catalogue content from local and international distributors. FIXPlay became the second catch-up TV service released by a commercial Australian network, the first being PLUS7 from Yahoo7 and the Seven Network.

2012–2013: Jump-in 
On 26 July 2012, Nine released Jump-in, a trial social television app on iPhone and iPad for its coverage of the 2012 Summer Olympic Games. The app allowed users to view information on the television broadcast, set reminders and comment on events, view the full Olympic schedule, latest medal tally, event results, news coverage and other video highlights. After its success throughout the Olympics, Jump-in was commercially launched on 4 February 2013 as an interactive television app that allowed viewers a behind-the-scenes insight into select television series, voting and posting live comments on select television series (that would appear on-screen), and entering competitions.

2013–2016: 9Jumpin 

On 8 November 2013, FIXPlay was merged into Jump-in, later renamed to 9Jumpin in May 2014, integrating catch-up TV with interactive social media. The app's original interactive TV features were integrated into its new website, while new catch-up content was now available on mobile devices. The 9Jumpin website was closed on 28 January 2016, one day after the silent launch of 9Now.

2016–present: 9Now 
In October 2015, with the upcoming launch of 9Life and relaunch of 9HD and looming network-wide rebrand, Nine announced that 9Jumpin would be replaced with an entirely new service called 9Now. Pete Wiltshire, chief revenue officer of Nine Entertainment Co., stated that "[9Jumpin] was never designed to be streaming product and it isn't" and announced that the purpose-built 9Now service will replace 9Jumpin as Nine's on-demand catch-up TV service with a wider range of content, while also delivering live streaming of Channel 9, 9Gem, 9Go! and 9Life. 9Now was described as "a premium destination for live streaming, catch-up and on-demand content for all of the Nine Network's linear channels". The 9Now website and app were launched on 27 January 2016 along with live streaming for Nine, with live streaming for the multichannels to launch on a later date. However, unlike competitors 7plus, ABC iview, SBS on Demand, and 10play, 9Now requires users to create an account before allowing access to catch-up content and live streaming. Livestreams for 9Go!, 9Gem and 9Life were launched on 17 May 2016.

Following the launch of 9Now, Nine's main regional affiliate WIN Television sued Nine Entertainment Co., alleging that the service violated its program supply agreement by broadcasting Nine programming into territories where it held exclusive rights. Justice Hammerschlag of the NSW Supreme Court dismissed the case on 28 April 2016, ruling that Nine had the right to stream its programming nationally because the affiliation agreement's definition of "broadcasting" did not cover live internet streaming. Nine's victory prompted network executives to revoke WIN's affiliation with the network beyond June 2016, and enter into a new regional affiliation with Southern Cross Austereo (WIN would concurrently switch to Network 10).

See also

Stan
Internet television in Australia
List of Internet television providers

References

External links

Nine Network
Video on demand services
Australian streaming companies
2016 establishments in Australia
Internet properties established in 2016